Scoparia ganevi is a species of moth in the family Crambidae. It is found in Bulgaria and Greece.

References

Moths described in 1985
Scorparia
Moths of Europe